Tom Boxer (born Cosmin Simionică on 6 January 1977 in Craiova) is a Romanian musician, disc jockey and record producer. He released his debut studio album Zamorena in 2008, spawning the single "Brasil" in collaboration with Anca Parghel and Fly Project, which topped the Romanian Top 100. Success followed with "Morena" (2009) featuring Antonia, reaching number two in Romania and the top ten in several other countries. The single was promoted by a controversial music video featuring lesbian scenes. After Boxer quit relations with Antonia, he started to collaborate with his long-time girlfriend Morena; this yielded the commercially successful release "Deep in Love" in 2011, which was certified Platinum by the Federazione Industria Musicale Italiana (FIMI) for 30,000 copies sold in Italy.

Discography

Singles

References

1977 births
Romanian DJs
Romanian dance musicians
Living people